The World Climate Programme (WCP) was established following the first World Climate Conference in 1979. The major sponsors are the World Meteorological Organization, United Nations Environment Programme, the Intergovernmental Oceanographic Commission of the United Nations Educational, Scientific and Cultural Organization (UNESCO), and the International Council for Science (ICSU).

The World Climate Research Programme is a component of the WCP.

See also
Global Carbon Project

Climatological research